Kithulgoda is a village which is situated in Kalutara District of Sri Lanka.

Populated places in Kalutara District